Artists Union or Artists' Union may refer to:

 The Artists Union of New York, active in the 1930s
 The Société de la Propriété Artistique et des Dessins et Modèles
 One of the creative unions in the Soviet Union
 The Scottish Artists Union